Trachoni ( or ) is a large village lying partly in the Limassol District of Cyprus, and partly in the British Overseas Territory of Akrotiri and Dhekelia. , it had a population of 3,952. Prior to 1974, Trachoni was inhabited both by Greek- and Turkish Cypriots. The Greek Cypriots constituted a majority.

References

Geography of Akrotiri and Dhekelia
Communities in Limassol District